George Joseph Folsey, A.S.C., was an American cinematographer who worked on 162 films from 1919 to his retirement in 1976.

Biography
Born in Brooklyn, Folsey was hired by Jesse Louis Lasky to work as an office boy in his newly formed Jesse L. Lasky Feature Play Company in New York City. Folsey earned his first screen credit for His Bridal Night in 1919. Leading lady Alice Brady was so satisfied with the way he photographed her she offered him a contract to shoot all her films. He worked for both Associated First National and Paramount Astoria Studios, then moved to Hollywood and worked for Metro-Goldwyn-Mayer, where he spent the bulk of his career.

Folsey's many credits include The Letter, The Cocoanuts, Animal Crackers, The Great Ziegfeld, A Guy Named Joe, The White Cliffs of Dover, Meet Me in St. Louis, The Clock, The Harvey Girls, Adam's Rib, A Life of Her Own, Million Dollar Mermaid, Seven Brides for Seven Brothers, The Cobweb, Cash McCall, and The Balcony. For television, he served as director of photography for various episodes of the series The Fugitive and a special starring figure skater Peggy Fleming, for which he won an Emmy Award for Best Cinematography for Nonfiction Programming.

Folsey was nominated for the Academy Award for Best Cinematography 13 times but never won. Eight months before his death, he was honored with the first Lifetime Achievement Award presented by the American Society of Cinematographers, for which he served as president in 1956–1957.

Folsey's son George Jr. is a director/producer/editor.

Folsey died in Santa Monica, California.

Filmography

 His Bridal Night (1919)
 The Fear Market (1920)
 Sinners (1920)
 The Stolen Kiss (1920)
 The Frisky Mrs. Johnson (1920)
 The Price of Possession (1921)
 Sheltered Daughters (1921)
 A Heart to Let (1921)
 Room and Board (1921)
 The Case of Becky (1921)
 Nancy from Nowhere (1922)
 A Game Chicken (1922)
 Slim Shoulders (1922)
 What's Wrong with the Women? (1922)
 The Man from M.A.R.S. (1922)
 The Bright Shawl (1923)
 The Fighting Blade (1923)
 Twenty-One (1923)
 The Enchanted Cottage (1924)
 Born Rich'‘ (1924)
 The Necessary Evil (1925)
 The Half-Way Girl (1925)
 Scarlet Saint (1925)
 Too Much Money (1926)
 The Savage (1926)
 Ladies at Play (1926)
 Orchids and Ermine (1927)
 See You in Jail (1927)
 Naughty but Nice (1927)
 American Beauty (1927)
 No Place to Go (1927)
 Her Wild Oat (1927)
 Lady Be Good (1928)
 The Butter and Egg Man (1928)
 The Letter (1929)
 The Hole in the Wall (1929)
 Gentlemen of the Press (1929)
 The Cocoanuts (1929)
 Applause (1929)
 The Battle of Paris (1929)
 Glorifying the American Girl (1929)
 The Laughing Lady (1929)
 The Big Pond (1930)
 Dangerous Nan McGrew (1930)
 Animal Crackers (1930)
 Laughter (1930)
 The Royal Family of Broadway (1930)
 Stolen Heaven (1931)
 Honor Among Lovers (1931)
 The Smiling Lieutenant (1931)
 Secrets of a Secretary (1931)
 My Sin (1931)
 The Cheat (1931)
 The Wiser Sex (1932)
 The Misleading Lady (1932)
 The Big Broadcast (1932)
 The Animal Kingdom (1932)
 Men Must Fight (1933)
 Reunion in Vienna (1933)
 Storm at Daybreak (1933)
 Stage Mother (1933)
 Going Hollywood (1933)
 Men in White (1934)
 Operator 13 (1934)
 Chained (1934)
 Forsaking All Others (1934)
 Reckless (1935)
 Page Miss Glory (1935)
 I Live My Life (1935)
 Kind Lady (1935)
 The Great Ziegfeld (1936)
 Hearts Divided (1936)
 The Gorgeous Hussy (1936)
 The Last of Mrs. Cheyney (1937)
 The Bride Wore Red (1937)
 Mannequin (1937)
 Arsene Lupin Returns (1938)
 Hold That Kiss (1938)
 The Shining Hour (1938)
 Fast and Loose (1939)
 Society Lawyer (1939)
 Lady of the Tropics (1939)
 Remember? (1939)
 Two Girls on Broadway (1940)
 Third Finger, Left Hand (1940)
 Come Live with Me (1941)
 The Trial of Mary Dugan (1941)
 Free and Easy (1941)
 Dr. Kildare's Wedding Day (1941)
 Lady Be Good (1941)
 Married Bachelor (1942)
 Rio Rita (1942)
 Grand Central Murder (1942)
 Panama Hattie (1942)
 Andy Hardy's Double Life (1942)
 Seven Sweethearts (1942)
 Dr. Gillespie's New Assistant (1942)
 Three Hearts for Julia (1943)
 Thousands Cheer (1943)
 A Guy Named Joe (1943)
 The White Cliffs of Dover (1944)
 Meet Me in St. Louis (1944)
 The Clock (1945)
 Ziegfeld Follies (1945)
 The Harvey Girls (1946)
 The Green Years (1946)
 Till the Clouds Roll By (1946)
 The Secret Heart (1947)
 Green Dolphin Street (1947)
 If Winter Comes (1948)
 State of the Union (1948)
 Take Me Out to the Ball Game (1949)
 The Great Sinner (1949)
 Adam's Rib (1949)
 Malaya (1949)
 The Big Hangover (1950)
 A Life of Her Own (1950)
 Vengeance Valley (1951)
 Mr. Imperium (1951)
 Night into Morning (1951)
 The Law and the Lady (1951)
 The Man with a Cloak (1951)
 Shadow in the Sky (1952)
 Lovely to Look At (1952)
 Million Dollar Mermaid (1952)
 All the Brothers Were Valiant (1953)
 Executive Suite (1954)
 Tennessee Champ (1954)
 Men of the Fighting Lady (1954)
 Seven Brides for Seven Brothers (1954)
 Deep in My Heart (1954)
 Hit the Deck (1955)
 The Cobweb (1955)
 Forbidden Planet (1956)
 The Fastest Gun Alive (1956)
 These Wilder Years (1956)
 The Power and the Prize (1956)
 House of Numbers (1957)
 Tip on a Dead Jockey (1957)
 Saddle the Wind (1958)
 The High Cost of Loving (1958)
 Imitation General (1958)
 Torpedo Run (1958)
 Count Your Blessings (1959)
 Cash McCall (1960)
 I Passed for White (1960)
 The Balcony (1963)
 Glass Houses (1972)
 Bone'' (1972)

References

External links

 
 

American cinematographers
Burials at Holy Cross Cemetery, Culver City
People from Brooklyn
1898 births
1988 deaths